Anant Gupta (born 8 January 1965) is Founder Chairman & CEO, TECHCELX, an integrated business acceleration and investment firm. He is also former President & Chief Executive Officer of HCL Technologies, a global information technology services company

Early life
Anant Gupta was born in Delhi on 8 January 1965. He schooled across the country including Don Bosco, Chennai, Bal Bharti Air Force School and Modern School in Delhi thanks to his father's travelling job.

Gupta obtained B.Sc. (Hons) Physics with Electronics from St. Xavier's College, University of Bombay in 1985 and M.Sc. (Engg) Microelectronics & Telecommunications, University of Liverpool, UK in 1987. He started his career as a Senior Design 
Engineer & Manager-R&D at India Telecomp Ltd where he set up the design group at the company.

Career
Gupta began his career with HCL in 1993. Since then he held a series of leadership positions in the company, most recently as CEO of the company. Prior to be appointed the CEO, he was President of HCL's Infrastructure Services Division.

Gupta left HCL on 20 October 2016 to start his own venture called TECHCELX which is an integrated business acceleration and investment firm focused on developing digital technology products & platforms.

Industry contributions
Anant Gupta wrote "The Blackbook on the Remote Infrastructure Management (RIM) Industry-- Demystifying the third 'wave' of Outsourcing". He is a founding member of NASSCOM's RIM Forum.

Gupta was appointed as Chairman of WEF's Steering Committee on IIoT. Gupta has also been a Task Force member of the New Energy Architecture project run by the World Economic Forum.

Gupta serves as a Trustee of the HCLT Foundation and is also the Executive Sponsor for the company's Diversity and Sustainability programs. His efforts towards empowering women employees at HCL won him the "2014 Women’s Empowerment Principles (WEPs) Leadership Award – 7 Principles" from UN Women and UN Compact.

Gupta has also been a Task Force member of the New Energy Architecture project run by the World Economic Forum.

References

Indian chief executives
Alumni of the University of Liverpool
Living people
1965 births
American technology chief executives